The inauguration of Manuel Roxas as the fifth president of the Philippines and the first president of the Third Philippine Republic occurred on July 4, 1946. The inauguration marked the commencement of Manuel Roxas's only term as president and of Elpidio Quirino's only term as vice president, when the Philippines gained independence from the United States.

1946 in the Philippines
Presidency of Manuel Roxas
Roxas, Manuel